Judith Amy Toll Trank (January 14, 1958 – May 2, 2002) was an American comedian, writer, and actress.

Career 
Born in Philadelphia, Pennsylvania, Toll wrote for television programs including Sex and the City, Boy Meets World, Alright Already, and The Geena Davis Show.  A Groundling trained in sketch and improv comedy, she started in the local comedy clubs of Philadelphia, such as The Jail House in West Philadelphia and The Comedy Factory Outlet in Old City. She also acted in several TV shows including Curb Your Enthusiasm and Red Shoe Diaries. She was also known for her portrayal of "Andrea Dice Clay", a parody of shock comedian Andrew Dice Clay. She co-wrote the film Casual Sex? with fellow Groundling Wendy Goldman. The film was based on a play they wrote at The Groundlings. Sex and the City episode "Cover Girl" (Season 5, episode 4) has been dedicated to Judy Toll, as well as the pilot episode of Less than Perfect.

Death
Toll died in 2002 of melanoma. Her life was the subject of a 2007 documentary, Judy Toll: The Funniest Woman You've Never Heard Of, produced by her brother.

References

External links

1958 births
2002 deaths
American film actresses
American television actresses
American television producers
American women television producers
American television writers
Deaths from melanoma
American women comedians
American women screenwriters
American women television writers
Jewish American female comedians
20th-century American comedians
20th-century American actresses
20th-century American women writers
20th-century American screenwriters
20th-century American Jews
21st-century American Jews
21st-century American women